Bălți is a Moldovan wine region. This area has no sizable industrial vineyards. Here are plants for the production of cognac wine materials, special fortified wines and partially for the production of table wine. In the north of Moldova mainly white grape varieties sorts are grown: Aligote, Pinot, Fetească, Traminer.

Wine regions of Moldova